Sageland (formerly, El Dorado Camp) is an unincorporated community in Kern County, California.

Quartz was discovered in the area in 1866 by miners from nearby Claraville. The New El Dorado Mining District was formed that year; the first mining settlement, El Dorado Camp, was renamed Sageland in 1867. By the spring of 1868, Sageland had become a boomtown with a population of almost a thousand, complete with multiple saloons, a billiard room, hotel, two stage lines to Havilah, and an opera house. Later that year, a silver rush occurred in White Pine County, Nevada, attracting legions of miners from Sageland and other California boom towns, an exodus known as 'White Pine Fever'. The St. John Mine closed in 1875 and by the next year, Sageland was essentially a ghost town. No structures remain from the original settlement, only fragments of stone walls.

The area was the site of a large village of Kawaiisu Indians. They were frequently accused of cattle rustling by white settlers, who would often retaliate mercilessly. Cup holes and pictographs are present in the vicinity.

References

Unincorporated communities in Kern County, California
Populated places established in 1866
Unincorporated communities in California
1866 establishments in California